Jilin railway station is a railway station of Changchun–Jilin intercity railway located in Jilin City, Jilin, China.

See also

Chinese Eastern Railway
South Manchuria Railway
South Manchuria Railway Zone
Changchun Light Rail Transit

References

Jilin City
Railway stations in Jilin
Stations on the Changchun–Jilin Intercity Railway